Associazione Calcio Renate is an Italian association football club based in Renate, Lombardy. It currently plays in Serie C.

History

The club was founded in 1947 as Unione Sportiva Renatese.

On 1961 the club has changed its name with Associazione Calcio Renate.

Lega Pro Seconda Divisione
On 4 August 2010, the club was admitted for the first time to the professional leagues despite finishing 5th in group B in the 2009–10 Serie D season in order to fill one of the sixteen vacancies available for the 2010-11 Lega Pro Seconda Divisione season following the bankruptcies and irregularities of other clubs. The team finished 5th their first season in Group A and a 2nd-place finish in 2013–14 ensured a spot in the inaugural unified Lega Pro division for 2014–15.

Serie C
The club has maintained their position in the third tier of the Italian football league system since 2014-15 and are currently competing in Group B of Serie C.

Colors and badge
Its colors are blue and black.

Current squad
Updated 31 January 2023.

Out on loan

Former players

 Andrea Mira

References

External links
Official homepage

Football clubs in Italy
Football clubs in Lombardy
Association football clubs established in 1947
Serie C clubs
1947 establishments in Italy
Renate, Lombardy